( or ) is a fjord in Narvik Municipality in Nordland county, Norway. It is a fjord arm that branches off of the main Ofotfjorden, on the south side of the town of Narvik. The Beisfjord Bridge on the European route E06 highway crosses the fjord between Ankenesstranda and Narvik.

History
A temporary bridge was set up over the fjord in July 1943 and a ferry connection was set up between Fagernes and Ankenesstranda.

See also
 List of Norwegian fjords

References

Narvik
Fjords of Nordland